Senator Shaw may refer to:

B. L. Shaw (1933–2018), Louisiana State Senate
Elizabeth Orr Shaw (1923–2014), Iowa State Senate
Henry Shaw (Massachusetts politician) (1788–1857), Massachusetts
Larry Shaw (politician) (fl. 1990s–2010s), North Carolina State Senate
Lemuel Shaw (1781–1861), Massachusetts State Senate
Robert Shaw (Ohio politician) (1904–1985), Ohio State Senate
Wayne Shaw (politician), Oklahoma State Senate
William Shaw (Illinois politician) (1937–2008), Illinois State Senate
Willis R. Shaw (1860–1933), Illinois State Senate